Sven Israelsson (17 January 1920 – 9 October 1989) was a Swedish nordic combined skier who won a bronze medal at the 1948 Winter Olympics. Earlier in 1947 he became the first foreigner to win the nordic combined event at the Holmenkollen ski festival.

Cross-country skiing results

Olympic Games

References

External links

 – click Vinnere for downloadable pdf file 

1920 births
1989 deaths
People from Vansbro Municipality
Swedish male cross-country skiers
Swedish male Nordic combined skiers
Olympic cross-country skiers of Sweden
Olympic Nordic combined skiers of Sweden
Cross-country skiers at the 1948 Winter Olympics
Nordic combined skiers at the 1948 Winter Olympics
Olympic bronze medalists for Sweden
Holmenkollen Ski Festival winners
Olympic medalists in Nordic combined
Medalists at the 1948 Winter Olympics